The Royal Garden is an Italian Renaissance garden. The garden is situated in Prague Castle, and created in 1534 based on the project by Emperor Ferdinand I of Habsburg. Its site was originally a vineyard that Emperor Ferdinand I purchased to create a garden for the royal court. The garden was founded simultaneously with the Queen Anne's Summer Palace, which was completed in 1560.

Gallery 

Parks in the Czech Republic
Prague Castle